To be hostile is a form of angry internal rejection or denial in psychology.

Hostile may also refer to:

 HMS Hostile (H55), an H-class destroyer
 One of the classes in the North Korean Songbun system
 , a 2017 film starring Brittany Ashworth and Grégory Fitoussi

See also

 Hostiles (disambiguation)